Ornithuroscincus albodorsalis is a species of skink found in Papua New Guinea.

References

Ornithuroscincus
Reptiles described in 1932
Taxa named by Theodor Vogt